Daniel Demarest House is located in Dumont, Bergen County, New Jersey, United States. The house was built in 1724 and is part of the Stone Houses of Bergen County TR. It was added to the National Register of Historic Places on January 9, 1983.

It is the oldest house in Bergen County and is one of many Bergen Dutch houses built by descendants of early settlers to New Netherland.

See also
National Register of Historic Places listings in Bergen County, New Jersey
List of the oldest buildings in New Jersey

References

Dumont, New Jersey
Houses on the National Register of Historic Places in New Jersey
Houses completed in 1724
Houses in Bergen County, New Jersey
Stone houses in New Jersey
National Register of Historic Places in Bergen County, New Jersey
New Jersey Register of Historic Places
1724 establishments in the Thirteen Colonies